Hans Hunt is an American politician and a former Republican Party member of the Wyoming House of Representatives who represented District 2 from January 11, 2011 to October 4, 2021. He resigned in 2021 to join Wyoming Senator Cynthia Lummis's office as an agriculture and trade policy adviser.

Elections
2020: Hunt was unopposed in the August 18, 2020 Republican primary and won with 2,299 votes.  He was unopposed in the November 3, 2020 general election and won with 4,121 votes.
2018: Hunt was unopposed in the August 21, 2018 Republican primary, winning with 2,607 votes  and was unopposed in the November 6, 2018 general election, winning with 3,261 votes.
2016: Hunt was unopposed in the August 16, 2016 Republican primary, winning with 2,002 votes  and defeated Democrat Harold Eaton in the November 8, 2016 general election with 3,863 votes (86.09%).
2014: Hunt was unopposed for the  August 19, 2014 Republican primary, winning with 2,352 votes  and was unopposed in the November 4, 2014 general election, winning with 2,985 votes.
2012 Hunt won the August 21, 2012 Republican primary with 1,924 votes (78.5%), and was unopposed for the November 6, 2012 general election, winning with 3,966 votes.
2010: after Democratic Representative Ross Diercks retired and left the district 2 seat open, Hunt won the three-way August 17, 2010 Republican primary with 1,217 votes (44.0%), and was unopposed for the November 2, 2010 general election, winning with 2,905 votes.

References

External links
Official page at the Wyoming Legislature
 

Place of birth missing (living people)
Year of birth missing (living people)
Living people
Republican Party members of the Wyoming House of Representatives
People from Newcastle, Wyoming
21st-century American politicians